Seyfi Taşhan is a Turkish political analyst, thought leader, and historian. He is the founder and the Director of Foreign Policy Institute, Turkey's first political think-tank. On April 9, 2015, speaking at an honorary ceremony in honor of Tashan, Turkish Foreign Minister Mevlut Cavusoglu referred to Tashan as "a guru in Turkish diplomacy, serving more than 40 years as the president of the Foreign Policy Institute and being a guiding light to the ministry as well."

Tashan's impact on Turkey's outlook from the international perspective played an important role, especially in the Council of Europe.

Early life
Tashan was born in Ankara in 1925. He received his education at Ankara University, Faculty of Letters, graduating in 1947.

Career 
In 1945 he entered Government Service at the State Organization for Press, Radio, Information and Tourism where he served until 1955 as an international affairs analyst. In 1950 he founded the Foreign Broadcast Services of Turkish Radios and from 1953 to 1955 he served as assistant to the Director in charge of information activities.

He received experience and training in France (1951) and the USA (1953). In 1954 he accompanied President Celal Bayar during his visit to the US as Information Assistant and Interpreter.

In 1971 he started publishing the Foreign Policy Review as a quarterly journal of international affairs. In 1974 with several academics he founded the Foreign Policy Institute hat he still directs. 
In this capacity he attended international conferences, organized many national and international seminars and published extensively in Turkish Foreign Policy and international affairs. He lectured in many countries on Turkey and Turkish Foreign Policy.

Tashan is a member of Turkish associations and foundations; include Kocatepe Rotary Club, Turkish Foundation for International Relations and Strategic Studies, Cyprus Foundations, and abroad member of IISS (London), member of the Board of Advisors Center for European Policy Studies (Brussels), member of the Middle East Advisory Board of Center Security and International Studies (Washington D.C.), member of the academic board of Association for 2000 (Den Haag), alumni member of East-West Institute(New York), member of Mediterranean Study Commission (Rome) and member of Le Cercle (London). As the Director of Foreign Policy Institute, Tashan attended international meetings including the Bilderberg Group.

Recognition 
In 1989 he received the distinguished service citation by the Minister of Foreign Affairs.

In 2014 he was given pro-Merit for his previous services in Council of Europe.

In 2015 he was given an award by the Ministry of Foreign Affairs for his continued services. That year he was awarded by Middle East Technical University in Ankara for his contribution to international studies.

In 2016 the Council for International Studies of several universities of İstanbul and İzmir awarded him as the founder of the Foreign Policy Institute.

Personal life 
Seyfi Tashan is the father of Turkish Ambassador to Mozambique Aylin Tashan, and the uncle of businesswoman Pembe Candaner.

References

1925 births
Ankara University Faculty of Political Sciences alumni
Turkish radio people
Living people
People from Ankara
Turkish publishers (people)